The Miss Budweiser were  22 hydroplanes sponsored by Budweiser beer that raced in the unlimited class under the U-12 banner. They were owned (some were leased backups) by Bernie Little. Anheuser-Busch sponsorship began in 1963, thanks to the friendship of Little and A-B president August Busch III. 

After Little's death in April 2003, his youngest son Joe ran the operation for the two final seasons. Following the 2004 season, changes in Anheuser-Busch leadership resulted in the end of their 42 successful years of sponsorship.

Notable drivers
Bob Schroeder 1963
Chuck Hickling 1964–1965
Bill Brow 1966–1967; 1 win
Mike Thomas 1967; 1 win
Bill Sterett 1968–1969; 5 wins
Dean Chenoweth 1970–1972, 1973, 1979–1982; 23 wins
Terry Sterett 1972
Howie Benns 1974; 3 wins
Mickey Remund 1975–1977; 6 wins
Ron Snyder 1978; 1 win
Jim Kropfeld 1983–1989;  22 wins
Tom D'Eath 1988–1991; 13 wins
Scott Pierce 1991; 4 wins
Chip Hanauer 1992–1995; 22 wins
Mike Hanson 1994; 1 win
N. Mark Evans 1994–1995
Mark Weber 1997; 1 win
Dave Villwock 1997–2004; 30 wins

References

External links
Bernie Little Companies – King of Boats

Racing motorboats
H1 Unlimited
Hydroplanes
Anheuser-Busch
Anheuser-Busch advertising